The Prime Minister's XI or PM's XI (formerly Australian Prime Minister's Invitation XI) is an invitational cricket team picked by the Prime Minister of Australia for an annual match held at the Manuka Oval in Canberra against an overseas touring team. The Australian team usually consists of up and coming grade cricketers from the Canberra region and state players.

In 1962–63 Sir Donald Bradman came out of retirement to play for the Prime Minister's XI against the MCC; it was the last time he ever played cricket and he was freakishly bowled by Brian Statham for 4. When he returned to the pavilion he told Robert Menzies "It wouldn't happen in a thousand years. Anyway that's my final appearance at the wicket."

India lost the December 1999 PM's XI by 164 runs.

England lost the 2002 Prime Minister's XI.

In 2003 there was a match between the PM's XI and an ATSIC Chairperson's XI held at Adelaide Oval.

Pakistan won the match in January 2005 with a five-wicket victory with seven overs remaining.

The 2005–06 match was changed from South Africa to the West Indies.
The team announced was captained by Justin Langer.

The match on 2 December 2005 had to end early due to the Canberra storms, with Australia getting 4/316, and West Indies finishing in the 31st over at 3/174. The PM's XI won by six runs using the Duckworth-Lewis method.

In 2006–2007 England lost to the Prime Minister's XI by 166 runs. The game was scheduled earlier than usual (10 November) due to the Ashes Series. It was the first English tour match of the summer.

In 2014, the Prime Minister's XI suffered the biggest defeat in the history of the match against England after being bowled out for just 92.

In 2018 the Prime Minister's XI beat South Africa by 4 wickets.

List of matches

Notable matches

Prime Minister's XI vs MCC 1954–55

In the MCC tour of Australia in 1954–55 the cricket loving Prime Minister of Australia Robert Menzies invited the MCC to a reception on the evening before the match and the ex-Australian captain Lindsay Hassett recited a ditty about facing "Typhoon" Tyson.
They say that this bloke Tyson is fast!
Faster than Larwood so they say!
They also say that he takes a run-up of a hundred yards!
Fast - psshaw! I'm not scared of him and his long run.
Tomorrow when I bat, I'll hook him out of sight!
 
When he finished there was a thunder-clap from the storm outside "Listen, he's just started his run-up!" joked Hassett. The match was a game played in one day with each side playing one innings rather than Limited overs cricket in the modern sense of the term. Hutton won the toss and opened with Bill Edrich, but both were out for 25/2, but Peter May made 101 and added 98 with Vic Wilson (29) and 76 with Tom Graveney (56). Johnny Wardle scooped and swatted 37 not out and the MCC declared on 278/7 after 40 eight-ball overs. The match had a party atmosphere and Hassett gave 9 of his players a bowl, six of them took a wicket and himself 2/34 with his medium pacers. Tailender Ian Johnson opened the Australian bowling and was out for 4, but his partner was the big hitting Richie Benaud who smashed the ball all over the ground in his 113 as the Prime Minister's XI made 247 off 30.3 overs at over a run a ball. One of his sixes was caught by the Governor General Field Marshal Sir William Slim and a businessman donated £35 and 10 shillings to local charities, 30 shillings for each six and 10 shillings for each four. Veteran batsman Sam Loxton hit 47 and Keith Miller 38 as Bill Edrich's fast bowling cost him 40 runs off 5 overs, though he did take 2 wickets. Johnny Wardle (4/73) produced a middle order collapse from 195/2 to 234/7 with Vic Wilson helping him with three catches. When Hassett came in to bat Tyson was brought on and took an outrageously long run up before bowling a slow donkey drop. He then bowled a real bouncer that hit Hassett on the hand before catching him off Len Hutton's leg spin (3/15) for a 31 run victory.

Prime Minister's XI vs MCC 1958–59

On the MCC tour of Australia in 1958–59 Prime Minister Robert Menzies had five Australian captains in his team; Lindsay Hassett, Ian Johnson, Arthur Morris, Ian Craig and Ray Lindwall, the all-rounder Sam Loxton and a Victorian wicket-keeper called Les Botham. They batted first and the opener Morris hit 14 boundaries in his 79 and Brian James, a New South Wales Country player hit 5 sixes in his 88 before retiring hurt. Tom Graveney took 2/38 with his leg-spin and Jim Laker 2/61. They declared on 288/7 off 38 eight-ball overs in two hours and thirty-five minutes, leaving the MCC roughly the same number of overs in slightly less time. Peter Richardson was out for a duck to Lindwall, Ted Dexter thrashed 76 before hitting his wicket and Colin Cowdrey struck 101 runs in 84 minutes with 10 boundaries to win the match by four wickets. After the victory the MCC batted on to entertain the crowd and Cowdrey reached his century before he was caught by Hassett off Morris (4/46), who ran through the lower order with his part-time leg-spin and they were all out for 332.

Prime Minister's XI vs MCC 1962–63

In the MCC tour of Australia in 1962–63 there was intense anticipation for the match against the Prime Minister's XI as the 54-year-old Sir Donald Bradman agreed to captain the team after 14 years without playing cricket. The thorough man that he was Bradman started practicing for the big day and 10,000 men, women and children came to see him bat for the last time. His old foe the MCC assistant-manager Alec Bedser agreed to play and the Bradman Pavilion was unveiled at the Manuka Oval. The Australian Prime Minister Robert Menzies was a keen cricket fan who initiated these matches in 1951 and the money raised was donated to Legacy, a charity for the dependents of deceased Australian servicemen. Ted Dexter won the toss and elected to bat with Bradman fielding at first slip they rattled the fence with 36 fours and birthday-boy Fred Trueman hit a six. David Sheppard top-scored with 72 and Colin Cowdrey made 42. Richie Benaud took 2/62 off 8 overs, but the bowling honours went to the Canberra leg-spinner G. Brown, who took 3/61. Dexter nicked a ball off Brown to Wally Grout, but was called back by Bradman when he walked as the umpire gave him not out. "Lord Ted" lofted the next ball to Cowper at extra-cover and walked off for 22. Dexter declared the innings at 253/7, leaving the Prime Minister's XI 254 to win and Bob Cowper (47) and Ray Flockton (45) got the home team off to a good start with 7 boundaries apiece. They had both departed and the score was 108/3 when the name of Bradman came up on the board and the great man in a baggy green cap walked out to the crease to a standing ovation, surrounded by photographers and greeted by the England team. Tom Graveney's leg-spin got him off the mark with a straight-drive and in the next over from Brian Statham the Australian politician Don Chipp hit a single to put Bradman on strike. Although it was the intention of the MCC to let Bradman get some runs, and to bat against Bedser, Statham bowled a leg-cutter that came off the inside edge, brushed the pads and bounced onto the stumps with just enough force to dislodge a bail and the Don was out. Statham threw up his hands in anguish and the crowd was stunned, but "the little man, after one brief look back at his broken wicket, walked quickly away, the step firm, the head erect, but the shoulders, one thought, now slightly stooped. He had made one scoring stroke, for four. The crowd watched him go and sighed. How much they wanted just a half-hour, at least, of him—as the Englishmen had." In his last Test 14 years before he had been bowled by Eric Hollies for a duck, four runs short of a Test average of 100.00. He reached the pavilion to the commiserations of the Prime Minister and the Duke of Norfolk and told them "It wouldn't happen in a thousand years. Anyway that's my final appearance at the wicket." After this the rest of the match was an anticlimax. Neil Harvey was out for 3 and the PM's XI were 123/6 before Richie Benaud (63) and Ken Mackay (49) restored the situation, but David Allen (5/68) took three quick wickets, G. Brown was unable to bat so the PM's XI were out for 250 and the MCC won by 3 runs. Robert Menzies invited both teams to dinner and at the end of his speech presented a delighted Fred Trueman with a silver tankard as a birthday present from the Australian people. The Duke joked to the Prime Minister "I suppose you know you've just destroyed the disciplinary labours of several months?"

Prime Minister's XI vs MCC 1965–66

On the MCC tour of Australia in 1965–66 the Prime Minister of Australia Robert Menzies had a
team that consisted of Australian Test players such as Wally Grout, Alan Connolly and Bob Cowper, retired veterans Neil Harvey, Richie Benaud and Jim Burke, young talent like Keith Stackpole and the teenaged Paul Sheahan as well as the famous West Indian fast bowler Wes Hall. Benaud captained the team and fulfilled 90% of his duties by winning the toss and choosing to bat. Thanks to Burke (79), Sheahan (60), Benaud (45) and Stackpole (32 not out) the Prime Minister's XI hit 288/7 in 35 overs, with the wickets shared amongst the touring bowlers with Jeff Jones taking 2/21, David Larter 2/43 and Bob Barber 2/72. The declaration came halfway through the day and the MCC's 289/8 also took 35 overs, though they passed 200 for the loss of two wickets as Geoff Boycott made 95 before he was run out, Colin Cowdrey 52 and M.J.K. Smith 51 not out. Eight bowlers were used, but the best was Jim Burke who took 2/5 with his infamous chucking action, dismissing John Murray and Jones for ducks in the closing minutes of the match.

References 
 Alec Bedser, May's Men in Australia, Stanley Paul, 1959
 A.G. Moyes and Tom Goodman, With the M.C.C. in Australia 1962–63, A Critical Story of the Tour, The Sportsmans Book Club, 1965
 E.W. Swanton, Swanton in Australia, with MCC 1946–1975, Fontana, 1977
 Fred Trueman, As It Was, The Memoirs of Fred Trueman, Pan Books, 2004
 Frank Tyson, In the Eye of the Typhoon: The Inside Story of the MCC Tour of Australia and New Zealand 1954/55, Parrs Wood Press, 2004

External links
Statistics

Australia in international cricket
Sport in Canberra
Cricket teams in Australia
Prime Minister of Australia
1951 establishments in Australia
Men's national sports teams of Australia